Benoxathian is an α1-adrenergic receptor antagonist. It was studied in animals for its antihypertensive (blood pressure lowering) effects in the 1980s.

References

2-Phenoxyethanamines
Abandoned drugs
Alpha-1 blockers
Pyrogallol ethers